Pages is the debut EP by the alternative rock band There for Tomorrow and was released on March 27, 2007. The EP have been worked in the earliest time in 2005, because of this, James Flaherty was still in the band during the time in development. This EP features Christian Climer since he join the band in 2006. In the same year, a few YouTube channels have showed early live performances of the band, showing slightly early versions of some songs that appear in the EP ("Wrong Way To Hide" and "Waiting",). Four of the tracks, "Addiction and Her Name", "Pages", "Waiting", and "Taking Chances" were remixed and re-recorded, and reappear on the second EP released by the band, the self-titled There for Tomorrow. Along with the EP, the band released their first music video for "Pages" directed by Chris Grieder.

Track listing

Development 
The earliest time of development is 2005, when the band still had James Flaherty on vocals and guitar. He unfortunately left on the same year for "undisclosed reasons", so for some time, the band was a trio although they were looking for recruits. The band lost their record deal with Wolfgramm Productions after they went defunct, so they have to go solo. On the same year, the band announced that the new band is Christian Climer and that James Paul Wisner (Underoath, and Paramore) was working with them as producer. And soon eventually made a music video for Pages, directed by Chris Grieder.

YouTube 
The band later found YouTube as a perfect place to make updates, skits, and overall promote the band in 2006. But there are multiple videos out there showing the band live, singing early versions of their songs such as Wrong Way To Hide, Waiting, and This Past Year which never had an official audio. All of these songs have in common is that they either have different lyrics, different song styles, or overall sounding different than their final counterpart.

Self-titled EP 
Four of the tracks, "Addiction and Her Name", "Pages", "Waiting", and "Taking Chances" were remixed and re-recorded, and reappear on the second EP released by the band, the self-titled There for Tomorrow which the band signed into Hopeless Records and James Paul Wisner also return as a producer.

Personnel
Maika Maile – lead vocals, rhythm guitar, programming
Christian Climer – lead guitar, backing vocals
Jay Enriquez – bass, backing vocals
Christopher Kamrada – drums, samples

References

External links
Official MySpace Profile
Official YouTube channel

2007 debut EPs
There for Tomorrow albums
Albums produced by James Paul Wisner